The canton of Sabarthès is an administrative division of the Ariège department, southern France. It was created at the French canton reorganisation which came into effect in March 2015. Its seat is in Tarascon-sur-Ariège.

It consists of the following communes:
 
Alliat
Arignac
Arnave
Auzat
Bédeilhac-et-Aynat
Bompas
Capoulet-et-Junac
Cazenave-Serres-et-Allens
Celles
Génat
Gestiès
Gourbit
Illier-et-Laramade
Lapège
Lercoul
Mercus-Garrabet
Miglos
Montoulieu
Niaux
Orus
Prayols
Quié
Rabat-les-Trois-Seigneurs
Saint-Paul-de-Jarrat
Saurat
Siguer
Surba
Tarascon-sur-Ariège
Val-de-Sos

References

Cantons of Ariège (department)